The 81st Group Army, formerly the 65th Group Army, is a military formation of the Chinese People's Liberation Army Ground Forces (PLAGF). The 81st Group Army is one of twelve total group armies of the PLAGF, the largest echelon of ground forces in the People's Republic of China, and one of three assigned to the nation's Central Theater Command.

History 

The 65th Group Army traces its lineage to its original incarnation, the 5th Column of the North China Field Army established sometime around 1946. It was initially composed of three brigades, the 13th, 14th, and 15th. In 1949 the unit was reorganized and redesignated as the 65th Army under the command of Hsiao Ying-t'ang.  In 1949 the 65th Army was composed of the 193rd, 194th and 195th Divisions.

The 65th Army was deployed to Korea in 1951. Following the Korean War the 65th Army was redeployed to Hebei in 1953.

In October 1960, the 195th Army Division, except its 575th Artillery Regiment, were transferred to the Engineer Troops and reorganized as 102nd Engineer District Command.

Formed in 1969, the 195th Division (Second Formation) was disbanded in 1985.

In May 1989, the 65th Army’s 193rd and 194th Infantry Divisions along with the 3rd Reserved Division were deployed to Beijing to enforce martial law and suppress the Tiananmen Square protests of 1989.

In 2002, the formation's ID number was changed from 50156 to 66455.

Organization 
In 2013 Blasko listed the formations of the army as:
193rd Infantry Division ('Red 1st Division'), Xuanhua, Hebei
70th Motorized Infantry Brigade, Chengde, Hebei
1st Armored Division, northern Tianjin municipality
Artillery Brigade
Air Defense Brigade

It appears that the 193rd Division has now become the 193rd Mechanized Infantry Brigade, and the 194th Motorized Infantry Brigade has disbanded.

See also 
Chinese People's Volunteer Army order of battle

References 

Field armies of the People's Liberation Army
Military units and formations established in 1949
Military of Zhangjiakou
Beijing Military Region